Kansas is an unincorporated community in Carroll County, in the U.S. state of Georgia.

History
A post office called Kansas was established in 1876, and remained in operation until 1883. The community was named after Kansas Territory, a U.S. territory which existed from 1854 to 1861.

References

Unincorporated communities in Carroll County, Georgia
Unincorporated communities in Georgia (U.S. state)